The Malayan slit-faced bat (Nycteris tragata) is a species of slit-faced bat that lives in Indonesia, Malaysia, Myanmar, and Thailand.

References

Nycteridae
Bats of Southeast Asia
Bats of Indonesia
Bats of Malaysia
Mammals of Singapore
Mammals of Myanmar
Mammals of Thailand
Mammals of Brunei
Fauna of Sumatra
Mammals described in 1912
Taxa named by Knud Andersen